Robin Johnson (born May 29, 1964) is an American actress. Johnson grew up in Park Slope, Brooklyn, New York City. She graduated from Brooklyn Technical High School in 1982.

Career
In connection with her role in Times Square, Robin Johnson signed an exclusive three-year contract with the Robert Stigwood Organization, with the understanding that RSO would develop film and music projects for her. RSO intended to market Johnson as "the female John Travolta," and her contract legally barred her from accepting offers or auditions from rival companies. Johnson therefore turned down calls from agents, producers and casting directors, but the projects that RSO promised her never came to fruition. Johnson took a job as a bank teller whilst waiting for her RSO contract to expire, and by the time it did, there were no offers for work. Johnson did some minor film and TV roles, but by the late 1980s, she gave up on acting and got a job as a traffic reporter on a Los Angeles radio station. Robin Johnson contributed to the audio commentary, with director Alan Moyle, which features on the 2000 DVD release of Times Square.

Filmography

Theatre
1997: An Unhappy Woman, Moving Arts Theatre, Los Angeles

References

External links

1964 births
American child actresses
American film actresses
Living people
Actresses from New York (state)
People from Park Slope
21st-century American women